Zanguiyeh-ye Olya (also Romanized as Zangūīyeh-ye ‘Olyā and Zangoeeyeh-ye ‘Olyā) is a village in Sarbanan Rural District, in the Central District of Zarand County, Kerman Province, Iran. At the 2006 census, its population was 18, in 7 families.

References 

Populated places in Zarand County